This is an alphabetical list of people with surname Cohen (or in a few cases, a double-barrelled surname that includes Cohen). For variant spellings of this name, see the pages for Cohn, Kohn, and Coen.

A
 Aaron Cohen (disambiguation), several people
 Aaron Cohen (Deputy NASA administrator) (1931–2010)
 Aaron Cohen (counterterrorist) (born 1976), Israeli-American writer, director, actor and former counterterrorist
 Aaron Cohen (judoka), American judoka
 Abby Joseph Cohen (born 1952), American economist and financial analyst
 Abe and Abraham Cohen (disambiguation), several people
 Abe Cohen (1933–2001), American football player
 Abraham Cohen de Herrera (c. 1570 – c. 1635), Sephardic Jewish philosopher and Kabbalist
 Abraham Cohen Pimentel (died 1697), Orthodox rabbi (Amsterdam)
 Abraham Cohen of Zante 1670–1729), physician, poet, rabbi (Venetian Republic)
 Abraham Cohen Labatt (1802–1899), American pioneer of Reform Judaism
 Abraham Burton Cohen (1882–1956), American civil engineer
 Abraham Cohen (editor) (1887–1957), rabbinical editor of the Soncino Books of the Bible
 Abram Cohen (1924–2016), American Olympic fencer
 Ada Cohen, American professor and historian
 Adam Cohen (journalist) (born c. 1962), American journalist at The New York Times
 Adam Cohen (musician) (born 1972), Canadian born musician, the son of Leonard Cohen
 Adam Cohen (scientist) (born 1979), associate professor of chemistry and chemical biology and of physics at Harvard University
 Adele Cohen (born 1942), American lawyer and politician
 Adva Cohen (אדוה כהן; born 1996), Israeli runner
 Aharon Cohen (1910–1980), Russian Empire-born, senior member of Mapam (Israeli political party)
 Al Cohen (1926–2020), American magic shop owner and practitioner
 Alan N. Cohen (1930–2004), American former co-owner of the Boston Celtics and the New Jersey Nets
 Alan Cohen (born 1954), American owner of the Florida Panthers
 Albert Cohen (disambiguation), several people
 Albert Cohen (novelist) (1895–1981), Greek-born Romaniote Jewish Swiss novelist
 Albert D. Cohen (1914–2011), Canadian businessman
 Albert K. Cohen (1918–2014), American sociologist
 Albert Cohen (producer), French producer of musicals and radio personality
 Alex Cohen, American radio dj, roller derby skater and author
 Alexis Cohen, American Idol contestant
Alfred M. Cohen (1859–1949), American lawyer and politician
 Alice Cohen, American singer-songwriter and artist
 Allen Cohen (poet) (1940–2004), editor of the San Francisco Oracle
 Allen Cohen (composer) (born 1951), American composer
 Almog Cohen (footballer) (born 1988), Israeli international association footballer
 Alon Cohen (born 1962), Israeli communications executive
 Alroey Cohen (born 1989), Israeli international footballer
 Amnon Cohen (born 1960), Israeli politician
 Amy Cohen-Corwin, American mathematician
 Anat Cohen, Israeli jazz clarinetist, saxophonist and bandleader
 Andrew and Andy Cohen (disambiguation), multiple people
 Andrew Cohen (colonial governor) (1909–1968), governor of Uganda
 Andrew Cohen (journalist) (born 1955), Canadian journalist and author
 Andrew Cohen (spiritual teacher) (born 1955), American spiritual teacher and author
 Andrew Cohen (politician) (born 1969), American politician in New York City
 Andrew Cohen (poker player) (born c. 1969), American bartender and poker player
 Andrew Cohen (footballer) (born 1981), Maltese international footballer
 Andy Cohen (baseball) (1904–1988), New York Giant player
 Andy Cohen (television personality) (born 1968), American television executive and pop culture blogger
 Anne Cohen (born 1941), Australian politician in New South Wales
 Annie Cohen-Solal, French academic and writer
 Anthony Cohen (born 1946), British social anthropologist
 Ari Cohen, Canadian actor
 Ariel Cohen (born 1959), Soviet-born American political scientist
 Arnaldo Cohen (born 1948), Brazilian pianist
 Arthur Cohen (disambiguation), several people
 Arthur Cohen (politician) (1830–1914), English barrister and Liberal Party politician
 Arthur Juda Cohen (1910–2000), leading member of the Dutch Underground resistance movement
 Arthur A. Cohen (1928–1986), American Jewish scholar, theologian and author
 Arthur G. Cohen (1930–2014), American businessman and philanthropist
 Asher Cohen, psychologist and President of the Hebrew University of Jerusalem
 Asi Cohen (born 1974), Israeli comedian 
 Assaf Cohen (born 1972), American actor
 Audra Cohen (born 1986), American 2007 NCAA Women's Tennis Singles Champion
 Audrey Cohen (1931–1996), founding president of the Metropolitan College of New York
 Avi Cohen (1956–2010), Israeli international footballer
 Avi Cohen (footballer, born 1962) (born 1962), Israeli international footballer 
 Avishai Cohen (bassist) (born 1970), Israeli jazz bassist, composer, and arranger
 Avishai Cohen (trumpeter) (born 1978), Israeli/American jazz trumpeter and composer
 Avishay Cohen (born 1995), Israeli footballer
 Avner Cohen, Israeli/American historian and author

B
 B. J. Cohen (born 1975), American footballer
 Barry Cohen (1927–1985), birth name of Barry Crane, American television director and producer
 Barry Cohen (politician) (1935–2017), Australian cabinet level politician
 Barry Cohen (attorney) (1939–2018), American lawyer
 Barry Marc Cohen (born 1954), American art therapist
 Ben and Benjamin Cohen (disambiguation), several people
 Ben Cohen (bridge) (1907–1971), British bridge player and writer
 Ben Cohen (businessman) (born 1951), co-founder of Ben & Jerry's ice cream
 Ben Cohen (rugby union) (born 1978), English rugby union international player
 Sir Benjamin Cohen, 1st Baronet (1844–1909), British politician and Jewish communal leader, MP for Islington East, 1892–1906
 Benjamin Victor Cohen (1894–1983), American political figure, member of President Franklin D. Roosevelt's Brain Trust
 Benjamin Cohen (political economist) (born 1937), American professor of International Political Economy
 Benjamin Cohen (born 1972), French musician known as Benjamin Diamond
 Benjamin Cohen (journalist) (born 1982), British journalist and Channel 4 news correspondent
 Bennett Cohen (1890–1964), American screenwriter
 Benyamin Cohen (born 1975), American journalist and author
 Bern Cohen (born 1949), American actor
 Bernard Cohen (disambiguation), several people
 Bernard Cohen (physicist) (1924–2012), American physics professor
 Bernard Cecil Cohen (born 1926), American political scientist and educator
 Bernard Cohen (painter) (born 1933), British artist
 Bernard S. Cohen (1934–2020), American politician in Virginia
 Bernard Cohen (Australian author) (born 1963), Australian writer
 Betty Cohen, American businesswoman
 Bobby Cohen (born 1970), American film producer
 Bonnie R. Cohen, American public servant
 Boyd Cohen (born 1970), American urban and climate strategist
 Brad Cohen, American motivational speaker and author
 Bram Cohen (born 1975), American computer programmer
 Bruce M. Cohen (1945–2010), American rabbi and peace campaigner
 Bruce Cohen (born 1961), American film producer
 Bryan Cohen (born 1989), American-Israeli basketball player

C
 Carl Cohen (born 1931), American philosopher
 Carl Cohen (1913–1986), American gambling executive and casino manager
 Carolyn Cohen, American biologist
 Cathy J. Cohen (born 1962), American author
 Chapman Cohen (1868–1954), English freethinker, secularist, atheist, writer, and lecturer
 Charles S. Cohen (born 1952), American real estate developer
 Charles Cohen, American free jazz musician and composer
 Chris Cohen (musician) (born 1975), American musician
 Chris Cohen (born 1987), English footballer
 Christopher A. Cohen, American director and producer
 Claude Cohen-Tannoudji (born 1933), French physicist
 Claudia Cohen (1950–2007), American gossip columnist and socialite
 Colby Cohen (born 1989), American ice hockey player
 Cora Cohen (born 1943), American artist
 Craig Cohen (broadcaster) (born 1972), American radio broadcaster
 Craig Cohen (political scientist) (born 1974), American political scientist

D
 Dan, Daniel and Danny Cohen (disambiguation), several people
 Dan Cohen (politician) (born 1936), American author and politician
 Dan Cohen (academic),  American historian
 Daniel Cohen (children's writer) (1936–2018), American writer
 Daniel Cohen (economist) (born 1953), French economist
 Daniel Cohen (conductor) (born 1984), Israeli Music director of Jersey Chamber Orchestra 
 Daniel I. A. Cohen (born 1946), American mathematician and computer scientist
 Danielle Cohen-Levinas (born 1959), French musicologist and philosopher
 Danny Cohen (television executive) (born 1974), director of BBC Television
 Danny Cohen (cinematographer), British cinematographer
 Danny Cohen (engineer), American computer scientist
 Dave and David Cohen (disambiguation), multiple people
 Dave Cohen (sportscaster) (born 1951), American sportscaster and actor
 Dave Cohen (American football) (born 1966), American college football coach
 David Cohen (military) (1917–2020), American member of the US Army, a liberator of the Ohrdruf concentration camp, and a schoolteacher
 Dave Cohen (writer), writer for television, radio and the Huffington Post
 David Cohen Nassy (1612–1685), Portuguese converso and colonialist
 David Jacob Cohen (c. 1883 – 1959), Indian politician
 David Cohen (rabbi) (1887–1972), Rabbi, talmudist, philosopher, and kabbalist
 David Cohen (politician) (1914–2005), American politician in Philadelphia
 David B. Cohen (psychologist) (1941–2004), American psychology professor
 David Bennett Cohen (born 1942), keyboardist
 David William Cohen (born 1943), American professor of history and anthropology
 David B. Cohen (mayor) (born 1947), American politician in Massachusetts
 David Mark Cohen (1952–1997), playwriting professor at the University of Texas at Austin
 David Elliot Cohen (born 1955), American editor and publisher
 David Cohen (art critic) (born 1963), American art critic, art historian, curator and publisher
 David X. Cohen (born 1966), American TV writer and producer
 David Steven Cohen (born 1967), American TV writer
 David Cohen (entrepreneur) (born 1968), American entrepreneur
 David Cohen (intelligence), New York City Police Department deputy commissioner, former CIA official
 David Cohen (physicist), Canadian M.I.T. physicist
 David L. Cohen, Pennsylvania politician
 Dick Cohen (born 1949), American politician in Minnesota
 Didier Cohen (born 1985), American-born Australian media personality, actor and model
 Dolly Cohen, French jewellery designer
 Donald J. Cohen (1940–2001), American psychiatrist and psychoanalyst
 Douglas J. Cohen, American composer/lyricist
 Dror Cohen (born 1974), Israeli basketball coach and former player

E
 E.G.D. Cohen (1923–2017), Dutch/American physicist
 Ed Cohen, American sportscaster
 Edward Cohen (1822–1877), Australian merchant and Mayor of Melbourne
 Elaine Lustig Cohen (1927–2016), American graphic designer, artist and activist
 Eli Cohen (disambiguation), several people
 Eli Cohen (1924–1965), Israeli spy executed by Syria
 Eli Cohen (actor) (born 1940), Israeli film actor and director
 Eli Cohen (politician born 1949), Israeli politician of the Likud party
 Eli Cohen (footballer born 1951), Israeli football player and  manager
 Eli Cohen (footballer born 1961), Israeli football player and manager
 Eli Cohen (politician born 1972), Israeli politician representing Kulanu
 Eliad Cohen (born 1988), Israeli model and actor
 Elie Aron Cohen (1909–1993), Dutch doctor, author and Auschwitz survivor
 Eliezer Cohen (born 1934), Israeli politician
 Eliot A. Cohen (born 1956), American professor of strategic studies
 Elizabeth D. A. Cohen (1820–1921), first female doctor in Louisiana
 Elizabeth Cohen, American TV journalist
 Ellen Naomi Cohen (1941–1974), American singer better known as "Mama" Cass or Cass Elliot
 Ellen Cohen (born 1940), American politician in Texas
 Elliot E. Cohen (1899–1959), American magazine editor
 Emil Cohen (1842–1905), German mineralogist
 Emil Cohen (comedian) (1911–2000), American comedian and singer
 Emma Cohen (born 1946), Spanish actress, director, producer and screenwriter
 Emory Cohen (born 1990), American actor
 Erin Cohen (born 1973), American actress whose stage name is Erin Daniels
 Erminie Cohen (1926–2019), Canadian senator for Saint John, New Brunswick
 Ernst Julius Cohen (1869–1944), Dutch chemist
 Etan Cohen (born 1974), American screenwriter and director
 Ethan Cohen (gallerist) (born 1961), American collector and art dealer
 Eugene D. Cohen (born 1946), American lawyer and writer
 Evan Montvel Cohen (born 1966), American businessman from Guam; founder of Air America Radio
 Evelyn M. Cohen, American art historian

F
 Felix S. Cohen (1907–1953), American lawyer and legal scholar
 Floris Cohen (born 1946), Dutch science historian
 Flossie Cohen (1925–2004), Indian-born pediatric immunologist 
 Frank Cohen (born 1943), British entrepreneur
 Fred Cohen (born 1956), American computer scientist
 Freddie Cohen (born 1957), British businessman and former Jersey politician
 Fritz Cohen (1904–1967), German composer

G
 Gabriel Cohen (born 1991), Israeli footballer
 Gal Cohen (born 1982), Israeli footballer
 Gary Cohen (born 1958), American sportscaster
 Gary Cohen (footballer) (born 1984), English footballer
 Gary G. Cohen, American theologian
 Gavriel Cohen (1928–2021), Israeli academic and politician
 George Cohen (artist) (1919–1999), American painter and art professor
 George Getzel Cohen (born 1927), South African physician and politician
 George Cohen (1939–2022), English football international and World Cup winner
 George H. Cohen, American director of the Federal Mediation and Conciliation Service
 Gerald Cohen (1941–2009), Canadian-born British professor of political theory
 Gerald Cohen (composer) (born 1960), American composer
 Gerry Cohen (director), American television director
 Geulah Cohen (1925–2019), Israeli politician and journalist
Gezi Cohen (born 1938), Israeli Olympic weightlifter
 Gideon Cohen, Israeli football player and manager
 Gil Cohen (disambiguation), several people
Gili Cohen (born 1991), Israeli Olympic judoka
 Glen Cohen, Jamaican-born British Olympic 400m runner
 Greg Cohen (born 1953), American jazz bassist

H
 H. Rodgin Cohen (born 1944), American lawyer
Hannah Cohen (philanthropist) (1875–1946), English civil servant and philanthropist
 Hannah Cohen (singer) (born 1986), American singer and model
 Harlan Cohen (1934–2020), American volleyball coach
 Harlan G. Cohen, the Gabriel M. Wilner/UGA Foundation Professor in International Law at University of Georgia
 Harriet Cohen (1895–1967), British pianist
 Harold Cohen (politician) (1881–1946), Australian politician in Victoria, and brigadier
 Harold Cohen (artist) (1928–2016), British-born American-based artist
 Harry Cohen (born 1949), Labour Party politician in the United Kingdom
 Haskell Cohen (1914–2000), American sports writer and basketball official
 Haylynn Cohen (born 1980), American model
 Henri and Henry Cohen (disambiguation). several people
 Henri Cohen (composer) (1808–1880), French music theorist and composer
 Henri Cohen (water polo) (died 1930), Belgian water polo athlete
 Henri Cohen (number theorist) (born 1947), French mathematician
 Henry Cohen (numismatist) (1806–1880), French numismatist, bibliographer and composer
 Henry Cohen (rabbi) (1863–1952), rabbi in Galveston, Texas, 1888–1952
 Henry Cohen, 1st Baron Cohen of Birkenhead (1900–1977), British physician, doctor and lecturer
 Henry Cohen (civil servant) (1922–1999), director of Föhrenwald
 Herb and Herbert Cohen (disambiguation), several people
 Herb Cohen (1932–2010), American personal manager, record company executive and music publisher
 Herb Cohen (negotiator), American negotiation expert
 Herbert B. Cohen (1900–1970), American judge and politician in Pennsylvania
 Herbert Cohen (fencer) (born 1940), American Olympic fencer
 Herman and Hermann Cohen (disambiguation), several people
 Herman Cohen (1925–2002), American movie producer
 Herman Jay Cohen (born 1932), American diplomat
 Hermann Cohen (Carmelite) (1820–1871), Jewish pianist and Carmelite priest
 Hermann Cohen (1842–1918), German philosopher
 Hillel Cohen (born 1961), Israeli scholar and author on Arab-Jewish relations
 Horace Cohen (born 1971), Dutch actor and comedian
 Howard Cohen, birth name of Howard Cosell, American sportscaster
 Hy Cohen (1931–2021), American baseball player

I
 I. Bernard Cohen (1914–2003), historian of science
 I. Glenn Cohen (born 1978), Canadian professor of law
 Ian Cohen (born 1951), Australian politician in New South Wales
 Ilana Cohen (born 1943), Israeli politician
 Ira Cohen (1935–2011), American filmmaker, poet, and photographer
 Irvin S. Cohen (1917–1955), American mathematician
 Irun Cohen (born 1937), American-born Israeli immunologist
 Irwin Cohen (1952–2012), American Olympic judoka
 Israel Cohen (footballer) (born 1971), Israeli footballer and amateur basketball player
 Itzik Cohen (footballer, born 1983), Israeli football international
 Itzik Cohen (footballer born 1990), Israeli footballer
 Izhar Cohen (born 1951), Israeli singer

J
 J. J. Cohen (born 1965), American actor
 J. M. Cohen (1903–1989), British writer and translator of European literature
 Jack Cohen (disambiguation), several people
 Jack Cohen (politician) (1886–1965), British Conservative Party politician, Member of Parliament for Liverpool Fairfield 1918–1931
 Jack Cohen (businessman) (1898–1979), British businessman
 Jack Cohen (rabbi) (1919–2012), American Reconstructionist rabbi
 Jack Cohen (scientist) (1933–2019), British biologist and special effects consultant
 Jacob Cohen (disambiguation), several people
 Jacob Raphael Cohen (1738–1811), Jewish minister in England, Canada, and the United States
 Jacob I. Cohen Jr. (1789–1869), Baltimore banker and Jewish-rights activist
 Jack Cohen (businessman) (1898–1979), supermarket founder born Jacob Kohen
 Jacob Cohen (1921–2004), birth name of American comedian Rodney Dangerfield
 Jacob Cohen (statistician) (1923–1998), U.S. statistician and psychologist
 Jacob Cohen (footballer) (born 1956), Israeli international footballer
 Jacob Cohen (scientist), scientist at NASA Ames Research Centre
 Jacques Cohen (born 1951), Dutch embryologist
 Jacques Cohen (computer science), American computer scientist
 Jake Cohen (born 1990), American/Israeli professional basketball player
 James Cohen (1906–1958), English Olympic athlete
 Janet Neel Cohen, Baroness Cohen of Pimlico (born 1940), British lawyer and crime fiction author
 Jared Cohen (born 1981), American political advisor and Google director
 Jason Cohen, filmmaker
 Jay Cohen (born 1968), American internet gambling executive
 Jay M. Cohen (born 1945), U.S. government official
 Jean Cohen (1941–2004), French virologist
 Jean L. Cohen (born 1946), American political scientist
 Jean-Louis Cohen (born 1949), French architect
 Jean-Michel Cohen (born 1959), French nutritionist and author
 Jeff and Jeffrey Cohen (disambiguation), several people
 Jeff Cohen (basketball) (1939–1978), American professional basketball player
 Jeff Cohen (songwriter) (born 1966), American songwriter, producer and publisher
 Jeff Cohen (actor) (born 1974), American attorney and former child actor
 Jeff Cohen (media critic), American founder of Fairness & Accuracy In Reporting
 Jeff Cohen (playwright and theater director), American theater director, playwright and producer
 Jeffrey A. Cohen (born 1954), American neurologist
 Jeffrey H. Cohen (born 1962), American anthropologist 
 Jem Cohen (born 1962), American filmmaker
 Jennifer Cohen (athletic director), American athletics administrator
 Jennifer Cohen (fitness) (born 1975), American fitness instructor and TV personality
 Jerome A. Cohen (born 1930), American professor of law and Chinese human rights advocate
 Jim Cohen (baseball) (1918–2002), American baseball player
 Jim Cohen (born 1942), American human rights and environmental activist
 Joanna Cohen, American TV soap opera writer 
 Joanna Waley-Cohen (born 1952), American professor of history
 Job Cohen (born 1947), Dutch politician
 Jody Cohen (born 1954), American rabbi
 Joe Cohen (born 1984), US American and Canadian footballer
 Joel Cohen (disambiguation), several people
 Joel Cohen (musician) (born 1942), American musician specializing in early music repertoires
 Joel Ephraim Cohen (born 1944), American mathematical biologist
 Joel Cohen (writer), American screenwriter
 Joel H. Cohen, Canadian TV writer for The Simpsons
 John Cohen (disambiguation), several people
 John Cohen (Australian politician) (1859–1939), Australian politician and judge
 John S. Cohen (1870–1935), U.S. Senator from Georgia
 John Cohen (musician) (1932–2019), American folk musician and photographer/filmmaker
 John Cohen (baseball) (born 1966), American college baseball coach
 Jon and Jonathan Cohen (disambiguation), several people
 Jon Cohen (entrepreneur) (born 1968), American music and media executive
 Jon Cohen (physician), American physician
 Jon Cohen (writer), American novelist and screenwriter
 Jonathan Cohen (conductor) (born 1977), British conductor and cellist
 Jonathan Cohen (musician), British musician, well known from children's television programmes
 Jonathan Cohen (television executive), American television executive
 Jonathan Cohen (actor), French actor
Jordan Cohen (born 1997), American-Israeli basketball player in the Israel Basketball Premier League
 Joseph Cohen (1891–1973), Canadian lawyer, academic and politician in Quebec
 Josh and Joshua Cohen (disambiguation), several people
 Josh Cohen (tennis), American tennis coach
 Joshua Lionel Cohen (1877–1965), birth name of Joshua Lionel Cowen, toy train magnate
 Joshua Cohen (philosopher) (born 1951), American philosopher
 Joshua J. Cohen (born 1973), mayor of Annapolis, Maryland
 Joshua Cohen (writer) (born 1980), American writer
 Joyce Cohen (politician) (born 1937), American politician in Oregon
 Judith Solomon Cohen (1766 – 1837), matriarch of Baltimore family
 Judy Kay Cohen (born 1952), American singer known as Juice Newton
 Julia Cohen (born 1989), American tennis player
 Julie Cohen, American actress and singer
 Julie E. Cohen, American legal scholar in intellectual property and Internet law
 Julius B. Cohen (1859–1935), English chemist
 June Cohen, American executive producer for TED Media

K
 Kalman J. Cohen (c. 1932 – 2010), American economist
 Kay Cohen (born 1952), Australian fashion designer
 Kerry Cohen (born 1970), American author
 Kip Cohen, American arts and entertainment executive

L
Larry Cohen (1941–2019), film director
 Landon Cohen (born 1986), American football defensive tackle
 Larry, Laurence and Lawrence Cohen (disambiguation), several people
 Larry Cohen (1941–2019), American film producer, director, and screenwriter
 Larry T. Cohen (born 1943), American bridge player
 Larry Cohen (bridge) (born 1959), American bridge player and writer
 Larry Cohen (union leader), American union leader
 Larry Cohen (soccer) (born 1987), South African footballer
 Laurence Jonathan Cohen (1923–2006), British philosopher
 Lawrence D. Cohen (politician) (1933–2016), American politician
 Lawrence D. Cohen, American screenwriter
 Leah Hager Cohen, American author
 Leon Cohen (1910–1989), Greek-born author and Auschwitz survivor
 Leonard Cohen (1934–2016), Canadian singer-songwriter and author
 Léonce Cohen (1829–1901), French composer
 Lesley Cohen (born 1970), American lawyer and politician in Nevada
 Lester Cohen (1901–1963), American author
 Lewis Cohen (cardmaker) (1800–1868), English-born American: major player in the playing card business
 Lewis Cohen (mayor) (1849–1933), South Australian politician and several times mayor of Adelaide
 Lewis Cohen, Baron Cohen of Brighton (1897–1966), British politician
 Liat Cohen, Franco-Israeli classical guitarist
 Lidor Cohen (footballer born 1992) (born 1992), Israeli footballer
 Liepmann Cohen (c. 1630 – 1714, also known as Leffmann Behrends), German financial agent of the dukes and princes of Hanover
 Lionel Louis Cohen (1832–1887), English financier, politician, and communal worker
 Lionel Cohen, Baron Cohen (1888–1973), British law lord
 Liran Cohen (born 1983), Israeli footballer
 Lisa R. Cohen, Canadian-born American news magazine producer
 Liskula Cohen (born 1972), Canadian-born New York-based model
 Lita Indzel Cohen (born 1940), American politician in Pennsylvania
 Liz Cohen (born 1973), American performance artist
 Lizabeth Cohen, American historian
 Lona Cohen (1913–1992), American-born spy for the U.S.S.R
 Lorenzo Cohen (born 1964), Italian-born cancer specialist in the U.S.
 Louis Cohen (conductor) (c. 1893 – 1956), English violinist and conductor
 Louis Cohen (1904–1939), American gangster
 Lynn Cohen (1933–2020), American actress
 Lynne Cohen (1944–2014), American-Canadian photographer
 Lyor Cohen (born 1959), American music industry executive

M
Malia Cohen (born 1977), American elected official in San Francisco, California
Mandy Cohen, American physician and health official
Marc Cohn (born 1959), American singer-songwriter
Mark B. Cohen (born 1949), Pennsylvania state legislator
Martin Cohen (soccer) (born 1952), South African footballer
Marvin L. Cohen (born 1935), physicist
Mary Ann Cohen, birth name of Mary Ann Magnin (1850–1943), co-founder of I. Magnin clothing store
Mary M. Cohen (1854–1911; pen name, Coralie), American social economist, writer
Matt Cohen (actor) (born 1982), American film and television actor
Matt Cohen (writer) (1942–1999), Canadian writer under the pseudonym Teddy Jam
Maurice Cohen (1927–2006), cryptographer
Maury M. Cohen (1913–1979), American filmmaker
Melissa Batya Cohen, South African-American activist and filmmaker
Mendes Cohen (1796–1879), American politician, traveler and businessman
Michael Cohen (disambiguation), several people
Michal Lamdani Cohen (born 1944), Israeli Olympic high jumper
Mickey Cohen (1913–1976), gangster in 1940s and 1950s
Mickey Cohen (soccer), American soccer player
Morris Cohen (disambiguation), several people
Morris Cohen (adventurer) (1887–1970), British-born adventurer and bodyguard for Sun Yat-sen
Morris Cohen (scientist) (1911–2005), metallurgist
Morris Cohen (Soviet spy) (1910–1995), Soviet spy
Morris Raphael Cohen (1880–1947), American Jewish philosopher
Myra Cohen (disambiguation), several people
Myron Cohen (1902–1986), American comedian and raconteur

N
Natalie Cohen (born 1989), birth name of Madame Mayhem, American singer/songwriter
Nathan Cohen (rower) (born 1986), New Zealand rower
Nick Cohen, British journalist and author
Nudie Cohn (1902–1984), pioneering designer of Western wear

O
Octavus Roy Cohen (1891–1959), writer and author
Ohad Cohen, Israeli footballer

P
Paul Cohen (disambiguation), several people
Paul Cohen (mathematician) (1934–2007), American mathematician
Paul Cohen (saxophonist), American saxophonist
Pierre Cohen, French politician
Philip P. Cohen, American chemist and researcher

R
Ralph Louis Cohen, American mathematician
 Rafi Cohen (born 1965), Israeli soccer player and coach
Ran Cohen, Israeli politician
Randy Cohen, American writer and humorist
Raphael H. Cohen, professor of economics and author
Raymond Cohen, British violinist
Reuben Cohen, Canadian businessman, educator, and lawyer
H. Reuben Cohen, Canadian businessman, educator, and philanthropist
Richard Cohen (disambiguation), several people
Richard A. Cohen, lecturer on conversion therapy
Richard I. Cohen, professor of Jewish history
Richard Cohen (columnist), syndicated columnist for the Washington Post
Richard E. Cohen, magazine correspondent
Rob Cohen, American film director, producer and writer
Robert Cohen (boxer) (1930–2022), French and Algerian boxer
Robert Cohen (cellist), British cellist
Robert Cohen (writer), Canadian comedy writer
Robert Donald Cohen (1933–2014), British physician
Roger Cohen, British-born journalist and author
Ronni Cohen, birth name of Ronni Chasen (1946–2010), American publicist
Ryosuke Cohen, mail artist

S
Sacha Baron Cohen, English actor and comedian
Samuel Cohen (disambiguation), several people
Sandy Cohen (born 1995), American-Israeli basketball player in the Israeli Basketball Premier League
Sarah Jacob Cohen (1923–2019), hand embroidery artist specialised in traditional Jewish art & craft works
Sasha Cohen, American figure skater
Saul B. Cohen, American human geographer
Scott Cohen (actor), American actor
Shaughnessy Cohen, Canadian politician
Sheldon S. Cohen (1927–2018), American lawyer
Sherm Cohen, American storyboard artist, and television writer and director best known for his work on SpongeBob SquarePants and Fish Hooks
Sidney Cohen (1910–1987), American psychiatrist and medical school professor
Sidney M. Cohen, Canadian television director and program creator
 Sharon Cohen, Israeli singer better known under the stage name Dana International
Shimon Cohen, Israeli footballer
Simcha Bunim Cohen, Orthodox rabbi and author
Simon Baron-Cohen, British psychologist
Spenser Cohen, American screenwriter
Stanley Cohen (disambiguation), several people
Stéphanie Cohen-Aloro (born 1983), French tennis player
Steve Cohen (judoka) (born 1955), American Olympic judoka
Steven A. Cohen, American hedge fund investor
Stephen F. Cohen, American scholar of Russian studies
Stephen M. Cohen, American convicted for internet-related frauds
Steve Cohen, member of the US House of Representatives for Tennessee
Steven Cohen (footballer), French-Israeli professional association footballer
Stuart David Cohen (1941–1982), American singer-songwriter known as David Blue
 Syd Cohen, American Major League Baseball pitcher

T
 Tamir Cohen (born 1984), Israeli soccer midfielder (Bolton Wanderers & Israeli national team)
Tanhum Cohen-Mintz (1939–2014), Latvian-born Israeli basketball player
Tanner Cohen, American actor and singer
Tarik Cohen, American football player
Tiffany Cohen (born 1966), American swimmer
Tim Cohen, American musician
Treyc Cohen, X Factor finalist

U

 Uri Cohen-Mintz (born 1973), Israeli basketball player

W
William Cohen, politician and former U.S. Secretary of Defense
William N. Cohen (1857–1938), American lawyer and judge

Y
 Ya'akov Cohen (born 1953), Israeli rabbi and politician
 Ya'akov Cohen (writer) (1881–1960), Israeli writer
 Yehoshua Cohen (1922–1986), Israeli militant and assassin
 Yoav Cohen (born 1999), Israeli Olympic windsurfer
 Yohanan Cohen (1917–2013), Israeli politician and diplomat
 Yonatan Cohen, Israeli football player
 Yoseph Bar-Cohen, physicist
 Yousef Hamadani Cohen, spiritual leader and chief rabbi for the Jewish community in Iran

Z
Zion Cohen, Israeli footballer

Fictional characters
Baruch Cohen, original name of fictional character Billy Joe Cobra from Dude, That's My Ghost!
Brian Cohen, fictional character from Monty Python's Life of Brian
Cohen the Barbarian, fictional character in Terry Pratchett's Discworld novels
Kirsten Cohen, fictional character on the FOX television series The O.C.
Mark Cohen (Rent), fictional character in the rock opera Rent
Max Cohen, fictional character in Darren Aronofsky's film Pi
Sander Cohen, fictional musician in the video game BioShock
Sandy Cohen, fictional character on the FOX television series The O.C.
Seth Cohen, fictional character on the TV show The O.C.
Tina Cohen-Chang, fictional character on the FOX television series Glee

References

See also
 Baron-Cohen
 George Cohen, Sons and Company, a scrap metal merchant in London
 Harold Cohen Library, University of Liverpool's library

Lists of people by surname